Christopher or Chris Gaffney may refer to:

 Christopher Gaffney (bishop) (died 1576), Irish bishop
 Chris Gaffney (musician) (1950–2008), American singer–songwriter
 Christopher Gaffney (archaeologist) (born 1962), British archaeologist